Johnstonianidae is a family of mites in the order Trombidiformes. There are about 7 genera and more than 20 described species in Johnstonianidae.

Genera
These seven genera belong to the family Johnstonianidae:
 Centrotrombidium Kramer, 1896
 Charadracarus Newell, 1960
 Diplothrombium Berlese, 1910
 Hirstiothrombium Oudemans, 1947
 Johnstoniana George, 1909
 Marcandreella Feider, 1957
 Tetrathrombium Feider, 1955

References

Further reading

 
 
 

Trombidiformes
Acari families